Een eerlijk zeemansgraf ("An honest seaman's grave") is the last volume of poetry published by Dutch poet J. Slauerhoff before his death.

Background and content
Slauerhoff's health had always been frail, and in October 1935 he was sick again, with malaria He was taken off his ship and brought to a hospital in Genoa. He spent time rehabilitating in Merano, Annecy, and Lausanne and by February 1936 fell ill again. He returned to the Netherlands, tenaciously hanging on to life in a nursing home in Hilversum but too weak to travel to a spa. He worked on Een eerlijk zeemansgraf in Hilversum, and wrote a note to fellow poet P. C. Boutens saying the volume's title was ominous. The collection indeed contains a poem called "Uitvaart" ("Funeral"), whose first draft he jotted down in his journal 12 years before, when he fell ill on his first sea journey.

Publishing history
The collection was published (by Nijgh & Van Ditmar, Rotterdam) as Slauerhoff was in the nursing home in Hilversum, where he would die of malaria and tuberculosis on 5 October 1936. The book was reprinted in 1937 and 1954 (edited by Kees Lekkerkerker), and then again in 1985 for Nijgh & Van Ditmar's edition of Slauerhoff's poetry in individual volumes.

Critical responses
Critic Kees Fens, in 1996, remembered that Een eerlijk zeemansgraf was, for him, the most engrossing of Slauerhoff's poems in part because it sketched a sailor's life so well. Fens loved the exotic names, and remarked that for Slauerhoff every port was his homeport as long as it wasn't a Dutch port.

References

External links
Een eerlijk zeemansgraf, third edition (1941) (PDF)

Dutch poetry collections
1936 poetry books